The Raven and the Reaping is the first album by the death metal band The Famine.  It was released on May 27, 2008 on Solid State Records. The song "Killing for Sport" was written in 10 minutes before being recorded.

Track listing

Credits
Kris McCaddon - vocals
Mark Garza - drums
Andrew Godwin - guitar
Nick Nowell - bass

References

2008 albums
Solid State Records albums